Karl Friedrich Friesen (25 September 1784 Magdeburg - 16 March 1814 La Lobbe, France) was a German gymnast and soldier, one of the principal promoters of gymnastics in Germany.

Biography
He studied at the Academy of Architecture, Berlin, collaborated on the great atlas of Mexico edited by Humboldt, and from 1810 was an instructor in the Plamann Institute. In 1810-12 he rendered important services to Jahn in the establishment of German gymnastics. Upon the outbreak of the German War of Liberation in 1813, he assisted in organizing the famous volunteer corps of Major von Lützow, whose adjutant he became. After the dispersion of the corps by Napoleon at Rheims, he was captured and shot by the French at La Lobbe, Ardennes on 15 March 1814. In 1843 his body was buried in the military cemetery at Berlin.

Legacy
He has frequently been celebrated by German writers, in particular by E. M. Arndt in Es thront am Elbestrande.

Notes

References
  This work in turn cites:
 Schiele, Friedrich Friesen Eine Lebensbeschreibung (Berlin, 1875)

1784 births
1814 deaths
German gymnasts
Freikorps personnel of the Napoleonic Wars
19th-century German educators